David Bartek (born 13 February 1988) is a retired Czech football midfielder who played for most of his career for Bohemians 1905.

References

External links

Profile at iDNES.cz
Guardian Football

Czech footballers
1988 births
Living people
Czech First League players
Bohemians 1905 players
SK Kladno players
Association football midfielders
Footballers from Prague